Homeobox protein Nkx-2.3 is a protein that in humans is encoded by the NKX2-3 gene.

NKX2C is a member of the NKX family of homeodomain-containing transcription factors, which are implicated in many aspects of cell type specification and maintenance of differentiated tissue functions.

References

Further reading

Transcription factors